Discharge pressure (also called high side pressure or head pressure) is the pressure generated on the output side of a gas compressor in a refrigeration or air conditioning system. The discharge pressure is affected by several factors: size and speed of the condenser fan, condition and cleanliness of the condenser coil, and the size of the discharge line. An extremely high discharge pressure coupled with an extremely low suction pressure is an indicator of a refrigerant restriction.

Cooling technology
Hydraulics
Hydrostatics
Pressure